Masma Chicche District is one of thirty-four districts of the province Jauja in Peru.

References